The 1910–11 Iowa State Cyclones men's basketball team (also known informally as Ames) represented Iowa State University during the 1910-11 NCAA College men's basketball season. The Cyclones were coached by Clyde Williams, in his fourth season with the Cyclones. The Cyclones played their home games at the Margaret Hall Gymnasium in Ames, Iowa.

They finished the season 6–11, 6–8 in Missouri Valley play to finish in third place in the North division.

Roster

Schedule and results 

|-
!colspan=6 style=""|Regular Season

|-

References 

Iowa State Cyclones men's basketball seasons
Iowa State
Iowa State Cyc
Iowa State Cyc